The Eastern Division of New South Wales is one of the three divisions of New South Wales along with the Central and Western divisions, established under the Crown Lands Act of 1869 for the purposes of land management and the separation of metropolitician and rural/regional areas. It is the most populated of the divisions, including Sydney and large coastal cities such as Newcastle and Wollongong. In 1907 it included the Armidale, Port Macquarie, Grafton, Maitland,Dungog, Scone, the Blue mountains, Sydney, Goulburn, Lismore, Coffs Harbour and Orange land boards, as well as the eastern part of the Wagga Wagga, Dubbo and Tamworth land boards.

References

Geography of New South Wales